Ahmed Brahim (ʾAḥmad Ibrāhīm; 14 June 1946 – 14 April 2016) was a Tunisian politician. He was the First Secretary of Ettajdid Movement and the leader of the Democratic Modernist Pole until April 2012, when his party merged into the Social Democratic Path of which he became the president. He was the Ettajdid Movement's candidate for President of Tunisia in the 2009 presidential election. A linguist by profession, he was a professor of French at Tunis University; his area of study was comparative linguistics.

Tunisian Revolution
After the fall of Zine el-Abidine Ben Ali, he was appointed by the new government as the Minister of Higher Education and left the post on 7 March.

Political positions
Brahim is in favor of the emergence of a "democratic modern and secular [laicist] state" not connected with Islamists. According to Brahim, this would require "radical" reform of the electoral system, which would improve the political climate in guaranteeing freedom of assembly and a large scale independent press, as well as repealing a law that regulated public discourse of electoral candidates.

References

External links
 

1946 births
2016 deaths
People from Medenine Governorate
Ettajdid Movement politicians
Democratic Modernist Pole politicians
Government ministers of Tunisia
People of the Tunisian Revolution
Academic staff of Tunis University
Members of the Constituent Assembly of Tunisia